Molpadiidae is a family of sea cucumbers, marine invertebrates with elongated bodies, leathery skins and tentacles that are found on or burrowing in the sea floor.

Description
Members of Molpadiidae are fairly small, plump sea cucumbers with a smooth or slimy skin and no tube feet. They are relatively inactive and live in a "U"-shaped burrow in sand or mud at the bottom of the sea, often at considerable depths. Their tentacles spread out above the sediment to catch food particles.

Genera
The following genera are accepted as being in the family Molpadiidae:
Cherbonniera Sibuet, 1974
Heteromolpadia Pawson, 1963
Molpadia Cuvier, 1817

References

Molpadiida